The 1978 San Francisco Giants season was the Giants' 96th season in Major League Baseball, their 21st season in San Francisco since their move from New York following the 1957 season, and their 19th at Candlestick Park. The team finished in third place in the National League West with an 89–73 record, 6 games behind the Los Angeles Dodgers.

Offseason 
 October 25, 1977: Frank Riccelli was traded by the Giants to the St. Louis Cardinals for a player to be named later. The Cardinals completed the deal by sending Jim Dwyer to the Giants on June 15, 1978.
 March 15, 1978: Gary Alexander, Gary Thomasson, Dave Heaverlo, Alan Wirth, John Henry Johnson, Phil Huffman, a player to be named later, and $300,000 were traded by the Giants to the Oakland Athletics for Vida Blue. The Giants completed the trade by sending Mario Guerrero to the Athletics on April 7.
 March 21, 1978: Alan Hargesheimer was signed as an amateur free agent by the Giants.
 March 27, 1978: Randy Elliott was released by the Giants.

Regular season 
The Giants won 42 games by a one run margin, an MLB record.

Season standings

Record vs. opponents

Opening Day starters 
Rob Andrews
Jack Clark
Darrell Evans
Larry Herndon
Marc Hill
Johnnie LeMaster
Willie McCovey
John Montefusco
Terry Whitfield

Notable transactions 
 June 6, 1978: John Rabb was drafted by the Giants in the 11th round of the 1978 Major League Baseball draft.
 July 18, 1978:  The Giants traded a player to be named later to the St. Louis Cardinals for John Tamargo. The Giants completed the deal by sending Rob Dressler to the Cardinals on July 24.

Roster

Player stats

Batting

Starters by position 
Note: Pos = Position; G = Games played; AB = At bats; H = Hits; Avg. = Batting average; HR = Home runs; RBI = Runs batted in

Other batters 
Note: G = Games played; AB = At bats; H = Hits; Avg. = Batting average; HR = Home runs; RBI = Runs batted in

Pitching

Starting pitchers 
Note: G = Games pitched; IP = Innings pitched; W = Wins; L = Losses; ERA = Earned run average; SO = Strikeouts

Other pitchers 
Note: G = Games pitched; IP = Innings pitched; W = Wins; L = Losses; ERA = Earned run average; SO = Strikeouts

Relief pitchers 
Note: G = Games pitched; W = Wins; L = Losses; SV = Saves; ERA = Earned run average; SO = Strikeouts

Awards and honors 

All-Star Game

 Jack Clark
 Vida Blue

Sporting News
 National league Pitcher of the Year: Vida Blue

Major League Baseball
 National League Player of the Month: Jack Clark (May 1978)

Farm system

References

External links
 1978 San Francisco Giants at Baseball Reference
 1978 San Francisco Giants at Baseball Almanac

San Francisco Giants seasons
San Francisco Giants season
San Francisco Giants